Pittoniotis is a genus of flowering plants belonging to the family Rubiaceae.

Its native range is from southern Mexico to Venezuela and Ecuador, in South America. It is found in Belize, Colombia, Costa Rica, Ecuador, El Salvador, Guatemala, Honduras, Mexico, Nicaragua, Panamá, south-western Caribbean and Venezuela.

The genus name of Pittoniotis is in honour of Joseph Pitton de Tournefort (1656–1708), a French botanist, notable as the first to make a clear definition of the concept of genus for plants. It was first described and published in Bonplandia (Hannover) Vol.6 on page 8 in 1858.

Known species
According to Kew:
Pittoniotis protracta 
Pittoniotis rotata 
Pittoniotis trichantha

References

Rubiaceae
Rubiaceae genera
Plants described in 1858
Flora of Mexico
Flora of Central America
Flora of the Southwest Caribbean
Flora of northern South America
Flora of Bolivia
Flora of Colombia
Flora of Ecuador